The Rural Municipality of Auvergne No. 76 is a rural municipality (RM) in the Canadian province of Saskatchewan within Census Division No. 3 and  Division No. 3.

History 
The RM of Auvergne No. 76 incorporated as a rural municipality on January 1, 1913.

Heritage properties
There are four historical properties within the RM.

Napao Site - (Also called Archaeological Site DkNv-2) is an archaeological site, with pre-contact remains.  The site is located 10 km west of Ponteix
Niska Site - (Also called Archaeological Site DkNv-3) is an archaeological site, with pre-contact remains.  The site is located 8 km south-east of Ponteix
Pinto River School - (Now called the Pinto River Community Centre) is a 1915 one-room school house, located 14,5 km south of the village of Aneroid.  The building operated as a one-room school house from 1915 until 1958.  Since closing as a school the building has been used as a community centre.
Tillet Hills - (Also called Archaeological Site DkNv-27 to 30, 36) is an archaeological site, with pre-contact remains.  The site is located along the Notukeu Creek valley 5 km north-east of Ponteix

Demographics 

Government 
The RM of Auvergne No. 76 is governed by an elected municipal council and an appointed administrator that meets on the second Thursday of every month. The reeve of the RM is Richard Marleau while its administrator is Sandra Krushelniski. The RM's office is located in Ponteix.

References 

A
Division No. 3, Saskatchewan